Herbert A. Allen III is an American businessman.

Biography
Allen is the son of Laura (née Parrish) and Herbert Allen Jr., former president of Allen & Company, and grandson of Herbert A. Allen, Sr. who co-founded Allen & Company with his older brother, Charles Robert Allen, Jr. Allen & Company was one of the first in the industry to specialize in corporate takeovers. He has three siblings: Charles, Leslie, and Christie. His parents later divorced and his father remarried Broadway dancer Ann Reinking. Allen graduated from Yale University. He took over Allen & Company in 2002 and is president and Chief Executive Officer of Allen & Company.

In October 2012, Vanity Fair ranked him number 18 in their list of The New Establishment. Herbert Allen III, also known as Herb Allen, is a Wilson Center Expert.

Personal life

Herbert Allen III is married to Monica de la Torre, a public-interest lawyer and native of Puerto Rico.

References

Living people
American investors
Stock and commodity market managers
Yale University alumni
American bank presidents
American chief executives of financial services companies
Year of birth missing (living people)
Allen family (investments)